The year 1531 in science and technology included many events, some of which are listed here.

Astronomy
 Halley's Comet makes its only appearance this century (Perihelion: August 26).

Earth sciences
 January 26 – Lisbon, Portugal, is hit by an earthquake.

Technology
 Autumn – Kõpu Lighthouse first lit on the Estonian island of Hiiumaa; it will remain in continuous use into the 21st century.

Births
 June 1 – János Zsámboky, Hungarian physician and scholar (died 1584)
 Agostino Ramelli, Italian engineer (died c. 1600)

Deaths
 February 16 – Johannes Stöffler, German mathematician (born 1452)
 March 28 − Nicholas Leonicus Thomaeus, Italian scholar an dprofessor of philosophy (born 1456)
 prob. date – Antonio Pigafetta, Italian circumnavigator (born c. 1491)

References

 
16th century in science
1530s in science